The 1904 Brown Bears football team represented Brown University as an independent during the 1904 college football season. Led by fifth-year head coach Edward N. Robinson, Brown compiled a record of 6–5.

Schedule

References

Brown
Brown Bears football seasons
Brown Bears football